Faizanullah Faizan is the former governor of Ghazni province, Afghanistan. He was appointed in September 2007 he replacing Merajuddin Patan.

References

Year of birth missing (living people)
Living people
Governors of Ghazni Province